Devin Vargas (born December 25, 1981) is an American professional boxer. As an amateur, he won a bronze medal at the 2003 Pan American Games and competed at the 2004 Olympics, both in the heavyweight division.

Amateur career
Vargas had a stellar amateur career prior to turning professional. Vargas was the National Golden Gloves Heavyweight Champion in 2000 and 2001. In 2003 he stopped Mike Marrone but was stopped inside the distance by eventual winner Charles Ellis. He became US champion in 2003. In international fights he lost twice to Kertson Manswell in 2003 but beat him in 2004 to qualify for the Olympics.

Vargas qualified for the Olympic Games by ending up in first place at the 1st AIBA American 2004 Olympic Qualifying Tournament in Tijuana, Mexico. He competed at the 2004 Olympics in Athens as a heavyweight representing the United States. His results were: 
1st round - Defeated Rachid El Haddak (Morocco) RSC-3 (1:20)
2nd round - Lost to Viktar Zuyev (Belarus) 27-36

Professional career

Vargas turned professional in 2004. He sustained his first defeat by a ranked opponent, Kevin Johnson (boxer), in a May 15, 2009 bout. It became clear early in the fight that Vargas was in over his head, being dropped in the 3rd—giving Johnson a massive lead—and again in the 5th round. Bloody and bruised during the latter, Vargas looked like a beaten man, and it was evident that the end was near. The end came with a flurry of combinations unleashed by Johnson early in the 6th round, thus scoring Johnson a TKO; had the fight been left to continue, it would have resulted in knock out. Mercy came when Vargas's corner saw the writing on the wall and, with a toss of a white towel, ended this mismatch, sparing Vargas further injury.

Personal life
He is the younger brother of boxer Dallas Vargas.

Professional boxing record

References

External links
 

1981 births
Living people
Boxers from Ohio
Olympic boxers of the United States
Boxers at the 2003 Pan American Games
Boxers at the 2004 Summer Olympics
National Golden Gloves champions
Winners of the United States Championship for amateur boxers
Sportspeople from Toledo, Ohio
American male boxers
Pan American Games bronze medalists for the United States
Pan American Games medalists in boxing
Heavyweight boxers
Bridgerweight boxers
Medalists at the 2003 Pan American Games